Sumana Gomes (born 23 May 1968), is a Sri Lankan cinema actress. Often regarded as the "sexiest actress in Sri Lankan film history", Gomes is credited as the premiere sex symbol and pioneer of blue film subculture in Sri Lankan cinema. She began her acting career at a young age, starring in the 1978 blockbuster Kundala Keshi directed by Wimalanath Dissanayaka. During a career that spanned 30 years, Gomes starred in close to 35 movies which also included biographical dramas, mainstream comedies and Erotic thrillers.

Early life
Gomes was born on 23 May 1968 in Dehiwala-Mount Lavinia. When she was a child she aspired to become a nurse or a policewoman. She graduated from the University of Colombo Faculty of Arts and enjoyed dancing which paved the way for her first movie role in Kundala Keshi.

Career
After a 6-year hiatus from her debut, Gomes played several minor roles in Sasara Chethana, Maubima Nathnam Maranaya, Raja Wedakarayo and Salambak Handai all as dancers. Her supporting roles with dialogues included Obata Divura Kiyannam where she portrayed Dilu's friend, Aragalaya which was her first challenging role and Hitha Hoda Surayoo where she starred opposite Vijaya Kumaratunga in 1995. However, her rise to mainstream limelight started when she collaborated with Louie Vanderstraeten and Sunil T. Fernando in the Erotic thriller genre.

Rise to fame and stardom
Gomes's first breakthrough role was 'Appa Soma' in the 1997 erotic blockbuster Ege Vairaya II directed by Louie Vanderstraeten and produced by Sunil T. Fernando. The movie portrayed an LGBTQIA+ theme and also featured Chandi Rasika who played the main role 'Indira' in Ege Vairaya I. In the same year Gomes starred in Karu Disanayaka's detective thriller Ragaye Unusuma where she portrayed 'Saroja', a journalist who went undercover to assist police raid a brothel and apprehend the perpetrators. Both movies made it to the podium at the 26th Sarasaviya Awards in 1998 winning 2nd and 3rd places in the 'Famous Film' award category, making Gomes a star.

In 1998, Gomes continued as the main actress in mainstream erotic blockbusters Akkai Nangi as 'Sachitra Gamage' and Ege Vairaya III as Ragika Subha Gurusinghe. By this time her movies had escalated to box office hits. In 1999, Gomes starred in the 900th film in Sri Lankan cinema Unusum Rathriya as Renu, a painter who entangles herself in an extramarital affair opposite Suresh Gamage and Sando Harris. In 2000, Gomes starred in Ege Vairaya IV as 'Kumari', ending the Ege Vairaya franchise.

In 2002, Gomes's stardom reached its peak with the box office record breaker Kamasutra where she portrayed 'Madam Sarojini' a nymphomaniac who could not control her desires opposite Shamal Atapattu, Kapila Sigera and Roshan Pilapitiya.

Legacy
During 80s and 90s, Gomes was featured as the cover girl in magazines including Sarasaviya, Aaradhana, Sarasi, Tharunaya, Thiratharu, Malsara and Vikasitha. She was nicknamed the  'Red flame of Sinhala cinema'  by investigative journalist Rohana Kumara. She was also widely acclaimed as හෙළ සිනමාවේ කාම රැජිණ or කාම ධේනුව (translated: the sex queen of Sri Lankan cinema). Voters of 'Top Ten list' global ranking website voted Sumana Gomes as No. 1 in its Greatest Sri Lankan Actresses list.

Personal life
Gomes married Gregory Torotolio, an Italian head chef on 31 January 2012. They live in New York City, United States.

Selected filmography 
 No. denotes the Number of Sri Lankan film in the Sri Lankan cinema.
 In bold text are movies she starred as the 'main actress'.

References

Sri Lankan film actresses
Sinhalese actresses
Living people
20th-century Sri Lankan actresses
Kala Keerthi
1968 births